Alessandro is an unincorporated community in Riverside County, California. It lies at an elevation of 1535 feet (468 m).

The town was laid out in 1887 and named for the hero in the novel Ramona. The Alessandro post office operated from 1888 to 1902.

References

Founded by Alessandro Ingram

Populated places established in 1887
Unincorporated communities in Riverside County, California
Unincorporated communities in California
1887 establishments in California